Nakanaia is a genus of leaf beetles in the subfamily Eumolpinae. It contains only one species, Nakanaia depressicollis. It is found on the island of New Britain in Papua New Guinea. The genus is named after the type locality of the type species, the Nakanai mountains.

References

Eumolpinae
Monotypic Chrysomelidae genera
Beetles of Oceania
Beetles of Papua New Guinea
Fauna of New Britain